The European Society for Clinical Investigation (ESCI) was founded on February 12, 1967 as a pan-European society of clinicians and scientists with a genuine interest in uncovering disease mechanisms. The term clinical investigation is interpreted widely, from bench-to-bedside and vice versa, including animal studies relevant to human health and disease.

Objectives
The objectives of ESCI are
the advancement of medical practice through biomedical science,
the cultivation of clinical research by the methods of the natural sciences,
the correlation of the science art and medicine,
the fostering of high standards of ethical practice and investigation, and
the diffusion of a spirit of fraternity and international cooperation among and through its members.
The goal is to be the leading clinical research society across Europe.

European Journal of Clinical Investigation
ESCI publishes the monthly European Journal of Clinical Investigation (EJCI), containing significant papers in the field of clinical investigation. The term clinical investigation is interpreted widely to include biomedical research from bench-to-bedside and vice versa including animal studies of relevance to human health and disease. The current journal impact factor is 2.714.

Awards
Every year, ESCI gives two awards and money prizes for the best basic and clinical research articles of the year published in European Journal of Clinical Investigation (EJCI). A significant part of the research must have been performed in Europe. The recipient of each of the awards delivers a plenary lecture during the Annual Scientific Meeting of ESCI, summarising the work for which the award was given.

Previous winners of the ESCI Awards

Annual Scientific Meeting
ESCI organizes an annual scientific meeting. ESCI awards travel grants for young scientists to attend the annual meeting.

Presidents of ESCI

References

External links 
 Official website
 European Journal for Clinical Investigation
 Membership
  ESCI Central Office: esci@umcutrecht.nl

Non-profit organizations based in Europe
Organizations established in 1967